Yanxi Town is a rural town in Liuyang City, Hunan Province, People's Republic of China. It is surrounded by Fushoushan Town of Pingjiang County on the north, Dahu Town on the northeast, Gugang Town on the west, Guandu Town on the east, and Yonghe Town on the south.

Administrative division
The town is divided into four villages and three communities, the following areas: 
 Yanxiqiao Community
 Jianshe Community
 Daguang Community
 Shalong Village
 Lihua Village
 Jinqiao Village
 Huayuan Village

Geography
The Daxi River flows through the town.

The Dajingchong Reservoir is the largest body of water in the town. It was built in the 1960s to provide drinking water for the town. The reservoir has also become a place for recreation for nearby residents.

Mountains located adjacent to and visible from the townsite are: Mount Tianzigang and Mount Fushou.

Economy
The main industries in and around the town are fireworks and animal farming.

Education
 Yanxi Middle School

Transportation

Expressway
The Changsha–Liuyang Expressway, from Changsha, running through the town to Jiangxi.

Provincial Highway
The Provincial Highway S309 runs southwest to northeast through the town.

Attractions
Mount Feilong and Lake Tianzi are famous scenic spots.

Religion
There are two Buddhist temples situated at the town: Huangtan Temple and Daguang Temple.

References

Divisions of Liuyang
Liuyang